Juraj Draxler  (born 13 December 1975 in Bratislava) is a Slovak Political Scientist and Politician. Between 2014 and 2016 he served as the Minister of Education, Science, Research and Sports of Slovakia as a nominee, but not a member, of the Direction – Slovak Social Democracy party.

Early life 
Draxler studied integrated social sciences at the Jacobs University Bremen and Political Science at University of York. He worked as a Reuters correspondent, Centre for European Policy Studies researcher and professor at the Anglo-American University and the University of New York in Prague.

Political career 

In 2014 he became advisor of the Minister of Education.  Between September and November 2014, he served as the State Secretary for Education under the Education Minister Peter Pellegrini. After Pellegrini became the Speaker of the National Council (Slovakia), Draxler replaced him as a minister. He did not return to government after the 2016 Slovak parliamentary election.

Personal life 
Following his terms as a minister, Draxler worked as a Head of the Institute of Strategic Analysis at the Slovak Academy of Sciences. In 2017, he announced birth of a daughter with his long term partner from Bulgaria. In 2016, published a novel called Petra.

References 

Living people
1975 births
Education ministers of Slovakia
Politicians from Bratislava
Alumni of the University of York